The Annas Farmhouse is a historic farmhouse built in 1832.  It was listed on the National Register of Historic Places in 1988.

It has a late Federal style/early Greek Revival style entrance way.

It is part of the Cazenovia Town Multiple Resource area.

References

Houses on the National Register of Historic Places in New York (state)
Federal architecture in New York (state)
Houses completed in 1832
Houses in Madison County, New York
National Register of Historic Places in Cazenovia, New York